Tomas Chlubna (born November 6, 1972) is a Czech former professional ice hockey player.

Chlubna played in the Czech Extraliga for HC Dukla Jihlava, HC Vítkovice, HC Železárny Třinec, HC Karlovy Vary and HC Znojemští Orli. He also played in the SM-liiga for JYP Jyväskylä and Tappara, the Russian Superleague for Metallurg Magnitogorsk and Severstal Cherepovets and the Slovak Extraliga for HC Slovan Bratislava.

References

External links

1972 births
Living people
Czech ice hockey left wingers
HC Dukla Jihlava players
Gazprom-OGU Orenburg players
BK Havlíčkův Brod players
JYP Jyväskylä players
EC Kapfenberg players
HC Karlovy Vary players
Metallurg Magnitogorsk players
HC Oceláři Třinec players
Orli Znojmo players
Sportspeople from Jihlava
HK Riga 2000 players
Severstal Cherepovets players
HC Slovan Bratislava players
Tappara players
Vålerenga Ishockey players
HC Vítkovice players
Yunost Minsk players
Czech expatriate ice hockey players in Slovakia
Czech expatriate ice hockey players in Finland
Czech expatriate ice hockey players in Russia
Czech expatriate sportspeople in Belarus
Czech expatriate sportspeople in Latvia
Czech expatriate sportspeople in Norway
Czech expatriate sportspeople in Austria
Expatriate ice hockey players in Belarus
Expatriate ice hockey players in Latvia
Expatriate ice hockey players in Norway
Expatriate ice hockey players in Austria